Virginia de' Medici (29 May 1568 – 15 January 1615) was an Italian princess, a member of the House of Medici and by marriage Duchess of Modena and Reggio.

Regent of the Duchy of Modena and Reggio in 1601 during the absence of her husband, she was able to protect the autonomy of the city of Modena from the attacks of the local Podestà and Judge. Her husband's infidelities increased her already erratic behavior and led to a permanent mental illness, which lasted until her death.

Life

Early years
Born in Florence on 29 May 1568, Virginia was the illegitimate daughter of Cosimo I de' Medici, Grand Duke of Tuscany and his mistress Camilla Martelli. Her paternal grandparents were the famous condottiere Giovanni dalle Bande Nere and his wife Maria Salviati (in turn the granddaughter of Lorenzo the Magnificent) and her maternal grandparents were Antonio Martelli and Fiammetta Soderini, both members of the most important families among the Florentine patricians.

Virginia was born after the formal resignation of her father of the government on behalf of her half-brother Francesco. Cosimo I contracted a morganatic marriage with Camilla Martelli on 29 March 1570 on the advice of Pope Pius V, and this allowed him to legitimize their daughter on the principle of per subsequens. Since that time, she lived with her parents at the Villa di Castello during the summer and in Pisa in winter. Cosimo I's older children resented their father's second marriage, and after the death of the Grand Duke in 1574, they imprisoned Camilla  in the Florentine convent of Murate.

Despite the controversy about her illegitimate birth and ambiguous position in the Grand Ducal house, Virginia's older brothers began negotiations with the House of Sforza of a marriage between her and one of his members. In 1581 she was betrothed to Francesco Sforza, Count of Santa Fiora, but the wedding didn't take place because the groom chose the ecclesiastical career and became a Cardinal. After this, it was decided to arrange her marriage with a member of the House of Este with the purpose to improve the relations between both families and break the isolation of the Grand Duchy of Tuscany from the other Italian states. Virginia's half-brother Cardinal Ferdinando has agreed with Cardinal Luigi d'Este for the marriage of his nephew and Virginia. In addition, the second wife of Grand Duke Francesco I, Bianca Cappello, also played a big role in the conclusion of this alliance.

Marriage and issue
In Florence on 6 February 1586 Virginia married Cesare d'Este, son of Alfonso, Marquis of Montecchio, in turn the illegitimate (but later legitimized) son of Alfonso I, Duke of Ferrara. To celebrate this event was represented the comedy "l’Amico Fido", written by Giovanni de' Bardi and with the lyrics of Alessandro Striggio and Cristofano Malvezzi, and in Ferrara the poet Torquato Tasso dedicated a Cantata to the newlyweds.

The union produced ten children, six sons and four daughters:

 Giulia d'Este (1588–1645); died unmarried.
 Alfonso III d'Este, Duke of Modena (1591–1644), Duke of Modena from 1628; married Princess Isabella of Savoy and had issue.
 Laura d'Este (1594–1630), twin with Luigi; married Alessandro I Pico, Duke of Mirandola and had issue, ancestress of Maria Teresa Cybo-Malaspina, Duchess of Modena.
 Luigi d'Este, Marquis of Montecchio and Scandiano (1594–1664), twin with Laura, General at the Imperial army; died unmarried but had illegitimate issue.
 Caterina d'Este (1595–1618); died unmarried.
 Anna Eleonora d'Este (1597–1651); a Poor Clare nun under the name of Sister Angela Caterina and later Abbess of the Monastery of Santa Chiara of Carpi.
 Ippolito d'Este (1599–1647), Knight of the Order of Malta and Commander of the Order of the Holy Sepulchre; died unmarried.
 Niccolo d'Este (1601–1640), Captain at the Imperial Army; married Sveva d'Avalos, no issue.
 Borso d'Este (1605–1657), Colonel at the Imperial Army and later General in the French Army; married Ippolita d'Este (illegitimate daughter of his brother Luigi) and had issue.
 Foresto d'Este (1606–1639), Captain at the Imperial Army; died unmarried.
At the end of February 1586 Virginia and Cesare arrived in Ferrara. They stayed at the Palazzo Diamanti, a gift of Cardinal Luigi d'Este, Cesare's uncle, who later bequeathed him all his possessions. One year later (1587), Virginia became in Marchioness consort of Montecchio after the death of her father-in-law.

After the extinction of the legitimate line of the House of Este with the death of Duke Alfonso II on 27 October 1597 without issue, Cesare inherited the headship and all the possessions of the family; in consequence, Virginia became in the Duchess consort of Ferrara, Modena and Reggio, Princess consort of Carpi, Princess of the Holy Roman Empire, Duchess consort of Chartres and Montargis, Countess consort of Gisors, Viscountess consort of Caen, Bayeux and Falaise. However, the rule over Ferrara was short-lived: although Emperor Rudolf II recognized the rights of Cesare over Modena and Reggio (both Imperial fiefs), Pope Clement VIII didn't recognized Cesare's succession in Ferrara (nominally a Papal fief) on grounds of doubtful legitimacy. On 15 January 1598 the Duchy of Ferrara was officially abolished and returned to the Papal States, despite Cesare's attempts to obtain the help of the major European powers. Cesare, with his family and court, were forced to move to Modena, who became in the new capital of the dynasty. In 1599 Cesare obtained the Lordship of Sassuolo, but in 1601 the Parlement of Paris stripped him of all the domains and titles in the Kingdom of France.

Mental illness and death

In 1596, the first signs of madness were manifested in Virginia, who suffered from this condition until her death. Nevertheless, she coped with her motherly duties with her numerous offspring and showed herself as a clever and far-sighted ruler when in January 1601, in the absence of her husband (who was in Reggio) the heavily pregnant Duchess took the position of Regent. During this time she stopped the attempts of the Podesta and Judge of Modena to deprive her of the government. However, Virginia was unable to control her unpredictable anger fits: when in March 1608 her confessor, the Jesuit Jerome Bondinari claimed that she was possessed by the devil, the Duchess violently attacked him with shouts and nearly beat him to death with a stick. After this, exorcism sessions were held in her, during which it became clear that Virginia's mental illness was caused by the fact that she was married against her will, and worsened due to the infidelities of her husband. The attempts of expulsion the demons in her finally originated that Virginia became completely insane. She only recovered her sense on the day of her death; in her deathbed, she blessed all her children and died peacefully.

Virginia died on 15 January 1615 in Modena aged 46; there were rumors that she was poisoned by her husband. The memorial service, who was held on 27 February at Modena Cathedral was celebrated by the Jesuit Agostino Mascardi. She was buried in the crypt of the House of Este in the Church of St. Vincent in Modena.

Notes

References

Bibliography
 
 
 
 

|-

|-

|-

1568 births
1615 deaths
Virginia
16th-century Italian nobility
17th-century Italian nobility
16th-century Italian women
17th-century Italian women
Hereditary Princesses of Modena
Virginia de' Medici
Virginia
Virginia
Virginia
Illegitimate children of Italian monarchs
17th-century women rulers
Daughters of monarchs